The 2010–11 Premier League (known as the Barclays Premier League for sponsorship reasons) was the 19th season of the Premier League since its establishment in 1992. The 2010–11 fixtures were released on 17 June 2010 at 09:00 BST. The season began on 14 August 2010, and ended on 22 May 2011. Chelsea were the defending champions.

Manchester United secured the title with a 1–1 draw away to Blackburn Rovers on 14 May 2011.
This was their nineteenth English league title, breaking a tie with Liverpool which had stood since Manchester United won their eighteenth title in 2009. Manchester United, Chelsea, Manchester City and Arsenal all secured a berth for the 2011–12 UEFA Champions League, while Tottenham Hotspur qualified for the 2011–12 UEFA Europa League via league position. At the bottom, West Ham United, Blackpool, and Birmingham City were relegated to the Championship.

Rule changes
The Premier League introduced a cap on the number of players in a squad. From this season onwards, clubs had to declare a squad of no more than 25 players when the summer transfer window shuts, and then again at the end of the January transfer window. Players aged 21 and under could be selected without being registered in the 25.

Also being introduced this season was the "home grown players" rule, which aims to encourage the development of young footballers at Premier League clubs. The new rule required clubs to name at least eight players in their squad of 25 players that have been registered domestically for a minimum of three seasons prior to their 21st birthday.

All of the Premier League teams submitted their 25-man squads on 1 September 2010 deadline.

Teams
Twenty teams competed in the league – the top seventeen teams from the previous season and the three teams promoted from the Championship. The promoted teams were Newcastle United, West Bromwich Albion (both teams returning after a season's absence) and Blackpool (returning after a thirty-nine-year absence). This was also Blackpool's first season in the Premier League. They replaced Burnley, Hull City and Portsmouth, ending their top flight spells of one, two and seven years respectively.

Stadiums and locations

''Note: Table lists in alphabetical order.

 1 Correct as of start of 2010–11 Premier League season

Personnel and kits

Note: Flags indicate national team as has been defined under FIFA eligibility rules. Players and Managers may hold more than one non-FIFA nationality.

Nike produced a new match ball, the Nike Total 90 Tracer, which was electric blue, black and white during the autumn and spring. A high-visibility version in yellow was released for the winter. Additionally, Umbro provided officials with new kits in black, lime green, yellow, red and cyan blue for the season. Tune Ventures, parent company of Air Asia, took over as sponsor of the referee kits for the next three seasons.

Managerial changes

League table

Results

Season statistics

Scoring
First goal of the season: Stewart Downing for Aston Villa against West Ham United (14 August 2010)
Fastest goal of the season: 30 seconds – Maxi Rodríguez for Liverpool against Fulham (9 May 2011)
Widest winning margin: 6 goals
Chelsea 6–0 West Bromwich Albion (14 August 2010)
Arsenal 6–0 Blackpool (21 August 2010)
Wigan Athletic 0–6 Chelsea (21 August 2010)
Newcastle United 6–0 Aston Villa (22 August 2010)
Manchester United 7–1 Blackburn Rovers (27 November 2010)
Highest scoring game: 8 goals
 Manchester United 7–1 Blackburn Rovers (27 November 2010)
 Everton 5–3 Blackpool (5 February 2011)
 Newcastle United 4–4 Arsenal (5 February 2011)
Most goals scored in a match by a single team: 7 goals – Manchester United 7–1 Blackburn Rovers (27 November 2010)
Fewest games failed to score in: 5 – Manchester United
Most games failed to score in: 13
 Stoke City
 West Ham United
 Wigan Athletic

Top scorers

Hat-tricks

 4 Player scored four goals
 5 Player scored five goals

Clean sheets

Player

Club
Most clean sheets: 18 – Manchester City
Fewest clean sheets: 2 – West Bromwich Albion

Discipline

Club
Worst overall disciplinary record (1 point per yellow card, 3 points per red card):
 Manchester City – 89 points (74 yellow & 5 red cards)
Best overall disciplinary record:
 Blackpool – 53 points (47 yellow & 2 red cards)
Most yellow cards: 75 – Newcastle United
Most red cards: 7 – West Bromwich Albion

Player
Most yellow cards: 14 – Cheick Tioté (Newcastle United)
Most red cards: 2
Lee Cattermole (Sunderland)
Craig Gardner (Birmingham City)
Laurent Koscielny (Arsenal)
Youssouf Mulumbu (West Bromwich Albion)
Ryan Shawcross (Stoke City)
Most fouls: 115 – Kevin Davies (Bolton Wanderers)

Awards

Monthly awards

Annual awards

Premier League Manager of the Season
Manchester United manager Sir Alex Ferguson, 69, received the Premier League Manager of the Season.

Premier League Player of the Season
The Premier League Player of the Season award was won by Nemanja Vidić of Manchester United.

PFA Players' Player of the Year
The PFA Players' Player of the Year was awarded to Gareth Bale.

PFA Team of the Year

PFA Young Player of the Year
The PFA Young Player of the Year was awarded to Jack Wilshere.

FWA Footballer of the Year
The FWA Footballer of the Year was awarded to Scott Parker.

Premier League Golden Boot
Dimitar Berbatov of Manchester United and Carlos Tevez of Manchester City shared the Premier League Golden Boot this season, both finishing with 20 goals. Berbatov's 20 goals came in 32 appearances, with Tevez's 20 goals coming in 31 appearances. This was the first time either player had won the award, and the first time it had been shared since the 1998–99 season.

Premier League Golden Glove
The Premier League Golden Glove award was won by Joe Hart of Manchester City.

Premier League Fair Play Award
The Premier League Fair Play Award was won by Fulham, who finished on top of the Fair Play Table. Newcastle United were deemed to be the least sporting team, finishing bottom of the table. Due to England being one of the three best teams in the UEFA Fair Play rankings, Fulham as the highest-ranked team not already qualified for a European competition were awarded a spot in the first qualifying round of the 2011–12 UEFA Europa League.

PFA Fans' Player of the Year
The PFA Fans' Player of the Year was awarded to Raul Meireles.

References

 
Premier League seasons
Eng
1